Igelsbach is a small river of Bavaria, Germany. It flows into the Igelsbachsee, which is connected to the Großer Brombachsee, near Absberg.

See also
List of rivers of Bavaria

References

Rivers of Bavaria
Weißenburg-Gunzenhausen
Rivers of Germany